Mastax gestroi is a species of beetle in the family Carabidae found in China and Myanmar.

References

Mastax gestroi
Beetles of Asia
Beetles described in 1892